Protein pellino homolog 2 is a protein that in humans is encoded by the PELI2 gene.

References

Further reading